Arabic nouns and adjectives are declined according to case, state, gender and number. While this is strictly true in Classical Arabic, in colloquial or spoken Arabic, there are a number of simplifications such as loss of certain final vowels and loss of case. A number of derivational processes exist for forming new nouns and adjectives. Adverbs can be formed from adjectives.

Noun and adjective inflection (Classical Arabic) 

Nouns and adjectives in Classical Arabic are declined according to the following properties:
 Case (nominative, genitive, and accusative)
 State (indefinite, definite or construct)
 Gender (masculine or feminine): an inherent characteristic of nouns, but part of the declension of adjectives
 Number (singular, dual or plural)

Nouns are normally given in their pausal form. For example,   "king" would be declined as   "king (nominative singular indefinite)",   "the king (nominative singular definite)", etc. A feminine noun like   "queen" would be declined as   "queen (nominative singular indefinite)",   "the queen (nominative singular definite)", etc.

Overview of inflection 
The following table is an overview of noun and adjective inflection in Classical Arabic:

NOTE:
 The plural forms listed are actually separate declensions.  Most singular adjectives of the indicated declensions, as well as some singular nouns, are declined in the plural according to the indicated plural declensions.  However, most nouns have a plural from a different declension — either a sound plural (declined according to one of the plural declensions, sometimes with a different stem as well) or a broken plural (invariably with a different stem, and declined according to one of the singular declensions).  Some adjectives also have broken plurals (again, with different stems, and declined according to one of the singular declensions).  See the discussion below on case for more details.
 The so-called "sound masculine" and "sound feminine" plural declensions refer to form, not gender – grammatically masculine nouns often have sound feminine plurals, and occasionally vice versa. (Note, however, that most nouns of this sort are inanimate objects, and as a result actually have feminine-singular agreement in the plural, regardless of their inherent gender or the form of their plural.  See discussion below.)
 Diptotes are declined exactly like regular triptotes other than in the singular indefinite state.
 In the defective-in--in declension, accusative -iyan occurs in singular nouns, while -iya occurs in broken plurals (especially three-syllable broken plurals such as  "nights" or  "hands", whose stem is of a form that would be declined as a diptote if it were declined regularly).
 There are only limited classes of invariable nouns and adjectives and none have their own plural declension; instead, they decline like one of the other singular or plural declensions.
Examples are   "stick" (and possibly   "approval").

The following table shows some examples of noun inflections.

The following table shows some examples of adjective inflections.

Number 
Arabic distinguishes between nouns based on number. All nouns are singular  dual, or plural.  In Classical Arabic, the use of the dual is mandatory whenever exactly two objects are referred to, regardless of whether the "two-ness" of the objects is explicit or not.  For example, in a sentence like "I picked up my children from school yesterday and then helped them with their homework", the words "children", "them" and "their" must be in the dual if exactly two children are referred to, regardless of whether the speaker wants to make this fact explicit or not.  This implies that when the plural is used, it necessarily implies three or more. (Colloquial varieties of Arabic are very different in this regard, as the dual is normally used only for emphasis, i.e. in cases similar to when an English speaker would use the word "two".)

Nouns take either a sound plural or broken plural. The sound plural is formed by adding endings, and can be considered part of the declension. The broken plural, however, is a different stem. It may belong to a different declension (see below), and is declined as a singular noun. On the other hand, the masculine triptote noun   "desk, office" has the plural  , which declines as a singular diptote noun: indefinite nominative  ; indefinite accusative/genitive  ; etc.

Generally, the only nouns that have the "masculine" sound plural   are nouns referring to male human beings (e.g.   "engineer").  On the other hand, the feminine sound plural  occurs not only on nouns referring to female human beings, but also on many nouns referring to objects, whether masculine or feminine (e.g. masculine   "exam", feminine   "car").  Note that all inanimate objects take feminine singular or feminine plural agreement in the plural, regardless of their "inherent" gender and regardless of the form of the plural.

Some nouns have two or more plural forms, usually to distinguish between different meanings.

There are over 70 broken plural patterns of which only 31 are common. These patterns are usually unpredictable and should be memorized for every word, however according to the generative linguistics McCarthy and Prince (1990), it's possible to guess the main broken plural form of around 83% of all CVCC and CVCVC nouns by using an algorithm that analyses syllables in moraic trochees.

Gender 
Arabic has two genders: masculine and feminine.  As mentioned above, verbs, adjectives and pronouns must agree in gender with the corresponding noun.  Gender in Arabic is logically very similar to a language like Spanish: Animate nouns, such as those referring to people, usually have the grammatical gender corresponding to their natural gender, but for inanimate nouns the grammatical gender is largely arbitrary.

"mother",   "earth").

The letter  used for feminine nouns is a special form known as   "tied T", which looks like the letter  (h) with the two dots that form part of the letter  (t) written above it.  This form indicates that the feminine ending  is pronounced  in pausa (at the end of an utterance). Words with the ending  never take alif ending for the indefinite accusative. Thus,   ("son") has final alif, but   ("daughter") does not.

In the colloquial variants, and in all but the most formal pronunciations of spoken Modern Standard Arabic, the feminine ending  appears only with nouns in the construct state, and the ending is simply pronounced  in all other circumstances.

State 
The grammatical property of state is specific to Arabic and other Semitic languages.  The basic division is between definite and indefinite, corresponding approximately to English nouns preceded, respectively, by the (the definite article) and a or an (the indefinite article).  More correctly, a definite noun signals either a particular entity previously referenced or a generic concept, and corresponds to one of the following in English: English nouns preceded by the, this, that, or a possessive adjective (e.g. my, your); English nouns taken in a generic sense ("Milk is good", "Dogs are friendly"); or proper nouns (e.g. John or Muhammad).  Indefinite nouns refer to entities not previously mentioned, and correspond to either English nouns preceded by a, an or some, or English mass nouns with no preceding determiner and not having a generic sense ("We need milk").

Definite nouns are usually marked by a definite article prefix   (which is reduced to  following vowels, and further assimilates to  etc. preceding certain consonants).  Indefinite nouns are usually marked by nunation (a following ).  Adjectives modifying a noun agree with the noun in definiteness, and take the same markings:
   "a big dog (nom.)"
   "I saw a big dog (acc.)"
   "with a big dog (gen.)"
   "the big dog (nom.)"
   "her big dog (nom.)" (the definite article does not appear with a suffixed possessive, but the noun is still definite, so the adjective takes the definite article)
   "I saw a nice picture (acc.)"
   "Ancient Egypt (nom.)" (proper nouns do not take the definite article, but are still definite)

A third value for state is construct.  Nouns assume the construct state when they are definite and modified by another noun in a genitive construction.  For example, in a construction like "the daughter of John", the Arabic word corresponding to "the daughter" is placed in the construct state and is marked neither with a definite article nor with nunation, even though it is semantically definite.  Furthermore, no other word can intervene between a construct-state noun and a following genitive, other than in a few exceptional cases.  An adjective modifying a construct-state noun is in the definite state and is placed after the modifying genitive.  Examples:
   "the daughter (nom.) of the queen"
   "the short daughter (nom.) of the queen"
   "the daughter (nom.) of the short queen"
   "the short daughter (gen.) of the queen" or "the daughter (gen.) of the short queen"
Note that the adjective must follow the genitive regardless of which of the two nouns it modifies, and only the agreement characteristics (case, gender, etc.) indicate which noun is modified.

The construct state is likewise used for nouns with an attached possessive suffix:
   "her daughter (nom.)"
   "her daughter (gen.)"
   "his daughter (nom.)"
   "his daughter (gen.)"
   "my daughter (nom./acc./gen.)"
   "her queen (gen.)"
   "her dog (nom.)"
   "her big dog (nom.)"
Note that in writing, the special form  indicating the feminine changes into a regular  before suffixes.  This does not affect the formal pronunciation.

When an indefinite noun is modified by another noun, the construct state is not used.  Instead, a construction such as   lit. "a daughter to the queen" is used.

Note also the following appositional construction:
   "the house with the wide windows" (lit. "the house wide of windows")

 Article 

The article الـ  is indeclinable and expresses the definite state of a noun of any gender and number. As mentioned above, it is also prefixed to each of that noun's modifying adjectives.

These 14 letters are called 'solar letters', while the remaining 14 are called 'lunar letters' or 'moon letters'. The solar letters all have in common that they are dental, alveolar, and postalveolar consonants (all coronals) in the classical language, and the lunar consonants are not.

 Agreement 
Adjectives generally agree with their corresponding nouns in gender, number, case and state.  Pronouns and verbs likewise agree in person, gender and number.  However, there is an important proviso: inanimate plural nouns take feminine-singular agreement.  This so-called "deflected agreement" applies to all agreement contexts, whether of adjectives, verbs or pronouns, and applies regardless of both the inherent gender of the noun (as indicated by singular and dual agreement) and the form of the plural of the noun.  Note that this does not apply to dual nouns, which always have "strict agreement".

 Case 

There are six basic noun/adjective singular declensions:
 The normal triptote declension, which includes the majority of nouns and adjectives. The basic property is a three-way case marking distinction -u -a -i. Most feminine nouns have an additional stem , and decline the same way. Some feminine nouns (and a few masculine nouns) have a variant stem , again with the same declensional endings. Note that there are some cases of nouns (and a few adjectives) whose gender does not match the stem form (in both directions). This affects the form, but not the inherent gender (or agreement properties) of these nouns.
 The diptote declension. Diptotes have a different declension only in the singular indefinite state. Diptote means that they only have two case endings. When the noun is indefinite, the endings are -u for the nominative and -a for the genitive and accusative with no nunation. The genitive reverts to the normal -i when the diptotic noun becomes definite (preceded by al- or is in the construct state)). These words are missing the nunation (final ) normally marking the indefinite. The class of diptote nouns mostly includes certain names, and broken plurals of particular forms (especially those with four stem consonants and three-syllable stems, as in   "desks, offices".
 The "long construct" declension.  These are triptotes with long case endings -ū -ā -ī in the singular construct state, and normal triptote endings elsewhere.  There are only five nouns in this declension, all very short (see below):   "father" (e.g.   "the father of Hasan");   "brother";   "father-in-law";   "mouth" (which assumes an irregular stem  in the construct state, e.g.   "the mouth of (nom.)"); and   "the owner of" (which appears only in construct and has a seriously irregular declension; see under demonstrative pronouns).
 The -in declension (Arabic  ). Such words were once declined as normal triptotes, but sound change has caused the last stem syllable to collapse together with the ending, leading to an irregular declension.
 The -an declension (Arabic  ).
 The invariable  declension (written either with "tall"   or  ). These words have the same form in all cases, both indefinite and definite. When this declension occurs in adjectives, it generally occurs as either the masculine or feminine singular portion of a complex paradigm with a differently-stemmed diptote conjugation in the other gender. "thirsty (fem.)". Masculine singular elatives and color/defect adjectives from third-weak roots have this declension themselves, e.g. "blind",   "nearer, lower".

Many (but not all) nouns in the -in, -an or -ā declensions originate as adjectives of some sort, or as verbal nouns of third-weak verbs.  Examples:   "judge" (a form-I active participle);   "hospital" (a form-X passive participle in its alternative meaning as a "noun of place");   "formal Arabic" (originally a feminine elative, lit. "the most eloquent (language)");   "world" (also a feminine elative, lit. "the lowest (place)").  In addition, many broken plurals are conjugated according to one of these declensions.

Note that all dual nouns and adjectives have the same endings , differing only in the form of the stem.

 Nominative case 
The nominative case is used for:

 Subjects of a verbal sentence.
 Subjects and predicates of an equational (non-verbal) sentence, with some notable exceptions.
 Certain adverbs retain the nominative marker (although not necessarily representing the nominative case).
 The citation form of words is (if noted at all) in the nominative case.

 Accusative case 
The accusative case is used for:
 Objects of a verbal sentence.
 The subject of an equational (non-verbal) sentence, if it is initiated with ''', or one of its "sisters".
Hence,   "the girl is beautiful" but   "the girl was beautiful" (spelling  is not affected here (letter ) in the unvocalised Arabic). The ending in brackets may not be pronounced in pausa or in informal Arabic.
 The object of a transitive verb.
 Most adverbs.
 Internal object/cognate accusative structure.
 The accusative of specification/purpose/circumstantial.

For the indefinite accusative, the  + nunation is added to an  e.g. , which is added to the ending of all nouns (e.g.

Genitive case 

The genitive case is used for:

 Objects of prepositions.
 The object of a locative adverb.
 Semi-prepositions if preceded by another (true or semi) preposition
 Objects of   "any".
 Elative (comparative/superlative) adjectives behave similarly:  "" "tallest boy('s)".

Pronunciation 
When speaking or reading aloud, nouns at the end of an utterance are pronounced in a special pausal form.

In writing, all words are written in their pausal form; special diacritics may be used to indicate the case endings and nunation, but are normally only found in books for students and children, in the Quran, and occasionally elsewhere to remove ambiguity. Only the accusative case for indefinite masculine nouns is often marked.

When speaking in less formal registers, words are essentially pronounced in their pausal form.
When speaking or reading aloud, the case endings are generally omitted in less formal registers.

Noun and adjective inflection in Colloquial Arabic 

In the colloquial spoken varieties of Arabic, much of the inflectional and derivational grammar of Classical Arabic nouns and adjectives is unchanged.  The colloquial varieties have all been affected by a change that deleted most final short vowels (also final short vowels followed by a nunation suffix -n), and shortened final long vowels.

 Loss of case
The largest change is the total lack of any grammatical case in the colloquial variants.  When case endings were indicated by short vowels, these are simply deleted.  Otherwise, the pausal form of the original oblique case has been usually generalized to all cases (however, in "long construct" nouns, it is nominative -ū that has been generalized).  The original nunation ending indicating the indefinite state is also lost in most varieties, and where it persists it has different functions (e.g. in conjunction with a modifier such as an adjective or relative clause).  The distinction between triptote and diptote has vanished, as has the distinction between defective -an and invariable -ā, which are both rendered by -a (shortened from -ā); similarly, defective -in nouns now have an ending -i, shortened from pausal/definite -ī.

Even in Classical Arabic, grammatical case appears not to have been completely integrated into the grammar.  The word order was largely fixed — contrary to the usual freedom of word order in languages with case marking (e.g. Latin, Russian) — and there are few cases in the Koran where omission of case endings would entail significant ambiguity of meaning.  As a result, the loss of case entailed relatively little change in the grammar as a whole.  In Modern Standard Arabic, case functions almost entirely as an afterthought: Most case endings are not pronounced at all, and even when the correct use of case endings is necessary (e.g. in formal, prepared speeches), the text is composed without consideration of case and later annotated with the correct endings.

Despite the loss of case, the original indefinite accusative ending -an survives in its adverbial usage.

 Restriction of the dual number
The dual number is lost except on nouns, and even then its use is no longer functionally obligatory (i.e. the plural may also be used when referring to two objects, if the duality of the objects is not being emphasized).  In addition, many varieties have two morphologically separate endings inherited from the Classical dual, one used with dual semantics and the other used for certain objects that normally come in pairs (e.g. eyes, ears) but with plural semantics. (It is sometimes suggested that only the latter variety was actually directly inherited, whereas the former variety was a late borrowing from the Classical language.) In some varieties (e.g. Moroccan Arabic), the former, semantic dual has nearly disappeared, and is used only with a limited number of nouns, especially those referring to cardinal numbers and units of measurement.

 Changes to elative adjectives
Elative adjectives (those adjectives having a comparative and superlative meaning) are no longer inflected; instead, the masculine singular serves for all genders and numbers. Note that the most common way of saying e.g.

 Preservation of remainder of system
Other than the above changes, the system is largely stable.  The same system of two genders, sound and broken plurals, and the use of multiple stems to complete the declension of some nouns and adjectives still exists, and is little changed in its particulars.

The singular of feminine nouns is normally marked in -a.  Former -in nouns are marked in -i, while former -an and -ā nouns are marked in -a, causing a formal merger in the singular with the feminine (but nouns that were masculine generally remain that way).  The former "long feminine" marked with pausal -āh normally is marked with -āt in all circumstances (even outside of the construct state).  Sound masculine plurals are marked with -īn, and sound feminine plurals with -āt; duals often use -ēn (< -ayn, still preserved in the occasional variety that has not undergone the changes ay > ē, aw > ō).

The system of three states also still exists. With loss of final -n, the difference between definite and indefinite simply comes down to presence or absence of the article al-. The construct state is distinguished by lack of al-, and in feminines in -a by a separate ending -at (or -it). The "older dual" (used for the plural of certain body parts, e.g. eyes and ears), which is often -ēn (< -ayn), has a separate construct form -ē (which becomes -ayya in combination with clitic suffix -ya "my"). Other duals, as well as sound plurals, do not normally have a construct state, but instead use an analytical genitive construction, using a particle with a meaning of "of" but whose form differs greatly from variant to variant, and which is used in a grammatical construction that exactly parallels the analytical genitive in English constructions such as "the father of the teacher".

Noun and adjective derivation 
A number of derivational processes exist for forming new nouns and adjectives. Most of these processes are non-concatenative, i.e. they involve a specific transformation applied to a root or word of a specific form, and cannot be arbitrarily combined or repeated to form longer and longer words. The only real concatenative derivational process is the nisba adjective -iyy-, which can be added to any noun (or even other adjective) to form an adjective meaning "related to X", and nominalized with the meaning "person related to X" (the same ending occurs in Arabic nationality adjectives borrowed into English such as "Iraqi", "Kuwaiti"). A secondary concatenative suffix is the feminine -ah, which can be added onto most nouns to make a feminine equivalent. The actual semantics are not very well-defined, but when added onto a noun indicating a man of some sort, they typically either refer to the women or objects with the same characteristics. The feminine nisba adjective -iyyah is commonly used to refer to abstract nouns (e.g.   "socialism"), and is sometimes added directly onto foreign nouns (e.g.   "democracy").

The most productive means of derivational morphology of nouns is actually through the existing system of the participles (active and passive) and verbal nouns that are associated with each verb. These words can be "lexicalized" (made into separate lexical entries, i.e. words with their own specific meanings) by giving them additional semantics, much as the original English gerund "meeting" and passive participle "loaded" have been lexicalized from their original meanings of "the act of meeting (something)", "being loaded into/onto someone/something", so that (e.g.) "meeting" can mean "a gathering of people to discuss an issue, often business-related" and "loaded" can mean "having much money (of a person)", "with a bullet in it (of a gun)", etc.

The system of noun and adjective derivation described below is of Classical Arabic, but the system in the modern colloquial varieties is nearly unchanged.  Changes occurring in particular formations are discussed below.

Collective nouns 
Certain nouns in Arabic, especially those referring to plants, animals and other inanimate objects that often appear in groups, have a special collective declension. For those nouns, the formally singular noun has plural semantics, or refers to the objects as an undistinguished mass. In these nouns, the singular is formed by adding the feminine suffix  (-ah), which forms the so-called singulative (  lit. "noun of unity"). (When more than 10 objects are counted, Arabic requires the noun to be in the singular.)

Examples:
  ḥajar "rocks" or "rock" (the material in general);  ḥajarah "a rock"
  šajar "trees";  šajarah "a tree";  ʼašjār (3 to 10) "trees"
  qamḥ "wheat",  qamḥah "a grain of wheat"
  baqar "cattle";  baqarah "a cow"

A similar singulative ending  -iyy applies to human or other sentient beings:
  jund "army";  jundiyy "a soldier"
  jinn "genies, jinns";  jinniyy "a genie"
  zinj "black people" (as a race);  zinjiyy "a black person"

Nisba  

The nisba is a common suffix to form adjectives of relation or pertinence.
   "Lebanon"
   "Lebanese" (masculine nominative singular)
   "Lebanese" (feminine nominative singular)
    "Lebanese" (masculine nominative plural)
   "Lebanese" (feminine nominative plural)

A construct noun and -adjective is often equivalent to nominal composition in English and other languages (solar cell is equivalent to sun cell).

The Arabic  has given rise to English adjectives of nationality for Arabic countries: Iraqi (from ), Kuwaiti (from ), etc.

Participles and verbal nouns 
Every verb has associated active and passive participles, as well as a verbal noun (lit. "source").  The form of these participles and verbal nouns is largely predictable.  For Form I (the basic type of verb), however, numerous possible shapes exist across the verbal nouns, and the form of the verbal noun for any given verb is unpredictable. In addition, some verbs have multiple verbal nouns, corresponding to different meanings of the verb.

All of these forms are frequently lexicalized (i.e. they are given additional meanings and become the origin of many lexical items in the vocabulary). In fact, participles and verbal nouns are one of the most productive sources of new vocabulary. A number of Arabic borrowings in English are actually lexicalized verbal nouns, or closely related forms. "uprising", the feminine of the verbal noun of the Form VIII verb   "to rise up", technically an instance noun);    (lit. "submission", from the Form IV verb  );  istiqlāl (lit. "independence", from the Form X verb  ). Many participles are likewise lexicalized, e.g. "engineer" (the active participle of the Form I quadriliteral verb    "to engineer").

Despite being unpredictable, linguists found that some maSdar patterns correlate with certain semantic fields. The most prominent are:

• CāCaC: this pattern occurs only in loanwords, mostly from Aramaic (but occasionally from other languages as well). For example: عالم `ālam from Aramaic āləmā.

• CaCC: this is a very productive pattern used to 1) form action nouns mostly from transitive CaCaCa verbs and 2) form collectives from originally CāCiC nouns. Examples include: ركب rakb (group of riders) from راكب rākib (rider) and شرب sharb (group of drinkers) from شارب shārib (drinker).

• CiCC: this is also a very productive pattern. It's used to form 1) action nouns involving mental actions, 2) body parts, 3) paired objects, 4) period of time units and 5) the young of animals. Examples: رجل rijl (foot),كبد kibd (liver).

Occupational and characteristic nouns 

Occupational nouns can be derived from many verb stems, generally using the form  , e.g.   "scribe" (from   "to write").  The same pattern is used to form characteristic nouns, i.e. nouns with the meaning of "person who habitually does X" rather than an occupation as such, e.g.   "liar".
The active participle can also be used to form occupational nouns, e.g.   "student" (from   "to ask"),   "writer" (from   "to write"),   "vendor" (from   "to sell"),   "engineer" (from   "to engineer").

Nouns of place 

A common type of derivational noun is the noun of place, with a form   or similar (prefix m(a)-), e.g.   "desk / office",   "library" (both from   "to write");   "kitchen" (from   "to cook");   "theater" (from   "to release").  Nouns of place formed from verbs other than Form I have the same form as the passive participle, e.g.   "hospital" (from the Form X verb   "to cure").

Tool nouns 
Just as nouns of place are formed using a prefix , tool nouns (also nouns of usage or nouns of instrument; Arabic   lit. "noun of tool") were traditionally formed using a prefix .  Examples are   "key" (from   "to open");   "road" (from    "to pursue");   "large basket" (from   "to gather");   "balance (i.e. scales)" (from   "to weigh");   "broom" (from   "to sweep").

However, the current trend is to use a different form  .  This is in origin a feminine occupational noun (e.g.   "female scribe").  It has been repurposed in imitation of the English use of -er/or in similar nouns (refrigerator, freezer, record player, stapler, etc.) and following the general association in Arabic between the feminine gender and inanimate objects.  The majority of modern inventions follow this form, e.g.   "telescope, eyeglasses" (  "to look");   "refrigerator" (  "to freeze quickly" <   "snow");   "stapler";   "tank" (  "to crawl").

Instance nouns 

An instance noun (nomen vicis or  ) is a noun that indicates a single occurrence of an action, and uses the suffix -ah: e.g.   "blow" (compare   "act of hitting, striking") or   "intifada, an uprising" (compare   "act of rising up, shaking off"). Instance nouns are generally formed from a verbal noun by the addition of the feminine ending. The terminology is unsettled; instance nouns are sometimes called "event instance nouns" or "nouns of single instance", or traditionally "nouns of unity", although this latter term is unsatisfactory because it can also refer to singulative nouns.

Diminutives 

Diminutives (  "diminutive noun") usually follow a pattern   or similar (  if there are four consonants).  Examples are   "little dog" (  "dog");   "little son" (  "son");   "Hussein" (  "good, handsome, beautiful").

Diminutives are relatively unproductive in Modern Standard Arabic, reflecting the fact that they are rare in many modern varieties, e.g. Egyptian Arabic, where they are nearly nonexistent except for a handful of lexicalized adjectives like   "good",   "small" < Classical   "small".  On the other hand, they were extremely productive in some of the spoken dialects in Koranic times, and Wright's Arabic grammar lists a large number of diminutives, including numerous exceptional forms.  Furthermore, diminutives are enormously productive in some other modern varieties, e.g. Moroccan Arabic.  In Moroccan Arabic, nearly every noun has a corresponding diminutive, and they are used quite frequently in speech, typically with an affective value ("cute little X", etc.).  The typical diminutive has the Moroccan form fʻila, fʻiyyel, fʻilel or similar – always with two initial consonants and a following , which is the regular outcome of Classical . (fʻila < ; fʻiyyel < ; fʻilel < .)

Adverb 

Adverbials are expressed using adjectives in the indefinite accusative, often written with the ending  (e.g.   "also") but pronounced "" even if it's not written (see accusative), e.g.:  , literally: "he read the book a slow reading"; i.e., "He read the book slowly".  This type of construction is known as the "absolute accusative" (cf. absolute ablative in Latin grammar).

Adverbs can be formed from adjectives, ordinal numerals:   "frequently, a lot, often",   "rarely",   "firstly" or from nouns:   "usually",   "very".

The second method to form adverbs is to use a preposition and a noun, e.g.  , e.g.   "swift, with speed",   "exactly".

References 

Arabic grammar
Declension